Edward (12 March 1336 – 24 August 1371) was the duke of Guelders and count of Zutphen from 1361 until 1371. He was the youngest son of Duke Reginald II of Guelders and his second wife, Eleanor of Woodstock, daughter of King Edward II of England.

In 1350, with encouragement from his mother, Edward began a devastating civil war against his brother Reginald III for control of the Duchy of Guelders.  Edward led the Bronkhorster (civil) faction which in 1361 in a battle at Tiel defeated the Heekeren (aristocratic) faction, led by Edward's incapable brother who was captured and imprisoned.  Edward governed well and powerfully, despite the conditions against him.  He allied himself with the bishops of Lüttich and with Jülich and Kleve.  In 1371, his brother-in-law and supporter, Duke William II of Jülich, got into a dispute with Duke Wenceslaus I of Luxembourg.  The dispute culminated in the Battle of Baesweiler in which William defeated Wenceslaus, but Edward was mortally wounded in the battle and died on 24 August 1371.  He is buried in the Kloster Graefenthal.  Upon Edward's death, his brother Reginald III regained the Duchy of Guelders but died shortly afterwards, on 4 December 1371.  As neither Edward nor Reginald had children, another war of succession for Guelders began, with the Bronkhorster faction supporting Edward and Reginald's half-sister Maria, wife of William II of Jülich, and the Heerkeren faction supporting their half-sister Mathilde, wife of Count John II of Blois.  In 1377, Emperor Charles IV awarded the Duchy of Guelders and the County of Zutphen to Maria's son William of Jülich.  After her total defeat in the Battle of Hönnepel on 24 March 1379, Mathilde renounced her claim to Guelders and Zutphen.

Edward was betrothed in 1368 to Katherine of Bavaria (30 May 1361 – 10 November 1400, buried Kloster Monkhuizen), daughter of Albert I, Duke of Bavaria and Margaret of Brieg.  Edward died when she was only 10 years old and Katherine subsequently married in 1379 to Edward's nephew, William of Jülich.

External links 
 Genealogie-Mittelalter.de

Dukes of Guelders
Counts of Zutphen
1336 births
1371 deaths
House of Wassenberg